The UK Albums Chart is one of many music charts compiled by the Official Charts Company that calculates the best-selling albums of the week in the United Kingdom. Before 2004, the chart was only based on the sales of physical albums. This list shows albums that peaked in the Top 10 of the UK Albums Chart during 1996, as well as albums which peaked in 1995 and 1997 but were in the top 10 in 1996. The entry date is when the album appeared in the top ten for the first time (week ending, as published by the Official Charts Company, which is six days after the chart is announced).

Ninety-seven albums were in the top ten this year. Three albums from 1994 and fifteen from 1995 remained in the top 10 for several weeks at the beginning of the year, while Evita: The Complete Motion Picture Music Soundtrack by Madonna and Various artists and Ocean Drive by Lighthouse Family were both released in 1996 but did not reach their peak until 1997. Bizarre Fruit by M People first charted in 1994 but took until 1996 to hit its highest position. The Bends by Radiohead was the only album from 1995 to reach its peak in 1996. Eight artists scored multiple entries in the top 10 in 1996. are among the many artists who achieved their first UK charting top 10 album in 1996.

The first new number-one album of the year was Expecting to Fly by The Bluetones. Overall, nineteen different albums peaked at number-one in 1996, with nineteen unique artists hitting that position.

Background

Multiple entries
Ninety-seven albums charted in the top 10 in 1996, with seventy-nine albums reaching their peak this year.

Eight artists scored multiple entries in the top 10 in 1996. The Beatles, Boyzone, Celine Dion, Madonna, Oasis, Robson & Jerome, Simply Red, The Smurfs were the acts to chart with two albums this year.

Chart debuts
artists achieved their first top 10 album in 1996 as a lead artist. had one other entry in their breakthrough year.

The following table (collapsed on desktop site) does not include acts who had previously charted as part of a group and secured their first top 10 solo album, or featured appearances on compilations or other artists recordings. 
 

Notes

Soundtracks
Soundtrack albums for various films entered the top 10 throughout the year. These included.

Best-selling albums
Alanis Morissette had the best-selling album of the year with Jagged Little Pill. The album spent 41 weeks in the top 10 (including 11 weeks at number one), sold around 2 million copies and was certified 7× platinum by the BPI.Spice by the Spice Girls came in second place. Oasis' (What's the Story) Morning Glory?, Falling into You from Celine Dion and Older by George Michael made up the top five. Albums by Robson & Jerome, The Fugees, Simply Red, The Beautiful South and Take That were also in the top-ten best selling albums of the year.

Top-ten albums
Key

Entries by artist
The following table shows artists who have achieved two or more top 10 entries in 1996, including albums that reached their peak in 1995 or 1997. The figures only include main artists, with featured artists and appearances on compilation albums not counted individually for each artist. The total number of weeks an artist spent in the top ten in 1996 is also shown.

Notes

See also
1996 in British music
List of number-one albums from the 1990s (UK)

References
General

Specific

External links
1996 album chart archive at the Official Charts Company (click on relevant week)

United Kingdom top 10 albums
Top 10 albums
1996